Arizona City is a census-designated place (CDP) in southwestern Pinal County, Arizona, United States. The population was 10,475 as of the 2010 U.S. Census. It is estimated to be approximately 11,030 as of a 2017 U.S. Census estimate. Arizona City is a rural, primarily residential community that features a 48-acre (19 ha) man-made lake. These attributes make the community a popular snowbird destination, with the population increasing by as much as 5,000 people in the winter months to reach the census figure of 11,030.

It is not to be confused with the Arizona City that became the city of Yuma.

History
The area around what is now known as Arizona City was used as a resting area for Juan Bautista de Anza's expedition party after they emerged from Apache land in 1775. The area is considered an official part of the Juan Bautista de Anza National Historic Trail. This historic trail begins in Sonora, Mexico, and ends at the Presidio in San Francisco, California.

The census-designated place was founded in 1959 when Jack McRae, president of the Arizona City Development Corporation, purchased and developed  of land in the Santa Cruz Valley in the area that would eventually grow to become the 6.2 square-mile modern day townsite. The location was selected because of the abundance of deep water from the Santa Cruz River found in the valley. At the time, the water was considered some of the purest in Arizona; every 14 days samples were sent to the state Health Department and would come back consistently rated 100% pure. As the community grew, a United States Post Office was established on April 1, 1962, and Arizona City began appearing on Rand McNally road atlases in 1963. It is uncertain how the name of the community was chosen.

From time to time, most recently in 2007, attempts have been made to incorporate as a municipality, but they have so far always been defeated at the ballot box, except for the first effort in the early 1980s, which succeeded at the ballot box but was overturned in court because there were not enough residents at that time to incorporate.

The area in and around Arizona City contained several of the 272 concrete Corona Satellite Calibration Targets, which were used to calibrate cameras on the satellites in the Corona Satellite Program that lasted from 1959 to 1972. These satellites were used for espionage on the Soviet Union (USSR) and China during the Cold War. Many of these have since been removed, but one still exists at the corner of West Alsdorf Road and South Sunland Gin Road in the center of the community.

Geography

Arizona City is located at  (32.751641, −111.679283).

Arizona City itself is mostly flat, lying in the Santa Cruz Valley in the center of three low mountain ranges; the Sawtooth Mountains to the south, the Picacho Mountains to the east, and the Casa Grande Mountains to the north.

Climate
Arizona City has a hot desert climate (Köppen climate classification BWh), normal for the Sonoran Desert. The community experiences long, extremely hot summers and mild winters. The area averages only  of annual rainfall. Nighttime lows at or below the freezing mark are not uncommon. During the winter, an occasional cold front will pass through the area sometimes containing a brief shower.

Along with the rest of Arizona, the community is affected by the North American Monsoon during summer, which brings high winds and occasional heavy rain. A large portion of the community is located in Pinal County's floodplain, and is very susceptible to flash flooding during heavy monsoon rains. Due to extensive farmland in the valley, the area is also very prone to dust storms, which can occur any month of the year during windy conditions.

Demographics

Arizona City first appeared on the 1990 U.S. Census as a census-designated place (CDP).

The 2010 Census determined that Arizona City had a population of 10,475, a 126% increase from the 2000 Census figure of 4,385. The racial and ethnic composition of the population was 50.3% non-Hispanic white, 2.1% black or African American, 5.3% Native American, 0.3% Asian American, 0.0% Pacific Islander, and 40.9% Hispanic. Population density was 1,713.6 people per square mile. There were 4,296 housing units, with an average of 2.56 persons per household. 62.3% of households were owner-occupied, and the median value of these housing units was $99,300. The median gross rent in Arizona City was $844 per month.

7.5% of the population was under 5 years of age, 26.5% of the population was between the ages of 5 and 18, and 18.8% of the population was 65 or older. 7.4% of the Arizona City's population was born in a country other than the United States.

Only 13.4% of the population in Arizona City has a bachelor's degree or higher, although 83.4% of the population has at least a high school diploma. The mean travel time to work was 27.7 minutes, and the median household income was $42,853, with 20.4% of the population living below the poverty line.

Economy

Historically, Arizona City's only employers have been the farms that surround the area and the few service jobs that exist within the townsite. However, being located in the middle of the Arizona Sun Corridor region, Arizona City's economy may soon be impacted by several large proposed attractions and factories that will potentially add 30,000 new jobs and attract up to 4 million visitors annually.

This project will contain an extreme sports venue, water parks, restaurants, retail space, a residential area, and a fully themed amusement park comparable to Walt Disney World. Another approved project is the Attesa Motorsports Park, which will be a 2,360-acre (955 ha) motorsports complex featuring two  road courses, a driver experience center, and an event center.

Phoenixmart was promised to boost the economy, the project never came to fruition and the site is just an empty building. Lucid Motors, a Silicon Valley electric car company startup, has confirmed that it will build a $700 million electric car manufacturing plant in the nearby city of Casa Grande that will employ 2,000 workers by 2022.

Infrastructure

Transportation
  Interstate 8
  Interstate 10

Both freeways can be accessed via Sunland Gin Road. The main east–west surface street through the CDP is Battaglia Drive, which has an intersection with the main north–south street, Sunland Gin Road, at the north end of Arizona City at the community's only signalized intersection. Other main north–south surface streets in the community include Henness Road, Lamb Road, and Overfield Road. Major east-west surface streets include Alsdorf Road and Milligan Road.

The closest major airports to Arizona City are Phoenix Sky Harbor International Airport and Tucson International Airport. Casa Grande Shuttle provides an airport shuttle to Sky Harbor.

Services
Shopping within Arizona City is limited. The five main stores in town are a Dollar General, Ace Hardware, a Food Town IGA grocery store, and the locally owned Sunlite Market. There are a number of small local restaurants, as well as a Domino's Pizza location for in-town dining. Within the community there is also a public library, a smoke shop, a number of churches, and a drive-thru liquor store. Arizona City also has a Moose Lodge location (#1038), which is an empty lot at this time. There is a branch of the United States Post Office. For fuel and other services, residents must travel to nearby Casa Grande or Eloy.

Attractions
 Arizona City Golf Course, opened in 1963, is an 18-hole golf course located within Arizona City that includes a clubhouse, pro shop, and restaurant.  However, the golf course has recently closed. It did reopen November 2021 
 Paradise Lake, a 48-acre (19 ha) man-made residential lake, is located in the southern portion of Arizona City and can be used for sailing and fishing.

Events

Every February, the community is host to the Arizona City Daze, which is a street festival featuring vendor booths selling food and merchandise, a car show, a parade, carnival rides, and live entertainment. This annual event typically takes place on the final weekend of February.

Education

The only education facility located in the community is Arizona City Elementary School, and it is part of the Toltec School District. The nearest high schools are located in Casa Grande and accept students from Arizona Elementary School.
 Arizona City Elementary School, a K–8 school located in the western part of the Arizona City.

See also
 Coolidge
 Florence

References

Census-designated places in Pinal County, Arizona